Cherif Younousse Samba (born May 22, 1995) is a Senegalese-born Olympic beach volleyball player competing for Qatar. In 2018, he alongside Ahmed Tijan clinched the gold medal at the 2018 Asian Games in Palembang, Indonesia.

He competed in the 2016 Summer Olympics with teammate Jefferson Pereira. They were eliminated in the round of 16 of the men's tournament.

After ending the partnership with Ahmed Tijan in 2014, they were reunited in 2017. The pair qualified for the 2020 Summer Olympics, where they won the bronze medal, the first ever medal for Qatar in beach volleyball.

References

External links
 
 
 
 

Qatari beach volleyball players
1995 births
Living people
Sportspeople from Dakar
Senegalese emigrants to Qatar
Beach volleyball players at the 2016 Summer Olympics
Olympic beach volleyball players of Qatar
Asian Games gold medalists for Qatar
Asian Games medalists in beach volleyball
Beach volleyball players at the 2018 Asian Games
Medalists at the 2018 Asian Games
Beach volleyball players at the 2020 Summer Olympics
Olympic bronze medalists for Qatar
Medalists at the 2020 Summer Olympics
Olympic medalists in beach volleyball